Emil Gazdov (born September 11, 2003) is a Canadian professional soccer player who plays as a goalkeeper for Pacific FC in the Canadian Premier League.

Early life
Gazdov began playing youth soccer with Mountain United FC. In August 2017, he joined the Vancouver Whitecaps Residency Academy, where he played for three years before leaving to sign a professional contract.

Club career
In March 2020, he began training with Canadian Premier League club Pacific FC. On June 30, 2020, Gazdov signed his first professional contract with Pacific FC of the Canadian Premier League. After not appearing in any matchday squads in the COVID-19 shortened 2020 season as the third-choice goalkeeper, Gazdov was sent on a two-year loan in October to the U19 side of German club 1. FC Nürnberg. He returned to Pacific FC in 2022 to serve as the backup goalkeeper. He made his professional debut on July 30, 2022 in a 2-1 victory over Valour FC.

Personal
Gazdov is of Bulgarian descent.

References

External links

2003 births
Living people
Association football goalkeepers
Canadian soccer players
Soccer people from British Columbia
Sportspeople from North Vancouver
Canadian Premier League players
Vancouver Whitecaps FC players
1. FC Nürnberg players
Pacific FC players